St. Mark's Episcopal Church is a historic church in San Antonio, Texas, United States. It is an Episcopal church in the Diocese of West Texas.

History
St. Mark's was founded as a parish in 1858. The church is located at 315 East Pecan Street in Travis Park, in the heart of the River Walk District and is only four blocks from the Alamo. It was added to the National Register of Historic Places on February 12, 1998.

Lady Bird Johnson and Lyndon B. Johnson were married at St. Mark's by Rev. Arthur R. McKinstry on November 17, 1934.

The rector is the Reverend Beth Knowlton (called to be rector on May 20, 2014).

St. Mark's belfry houses a bell that was cast in New York in 1874 from the remains of the "Come and Take It" cannon that ignited the Texas Revolution in 1835 at Gonzales, TX. The cannon; a six-pound, Spanish made, bronze, artillery piece was unearthed in 1852, inside the Alamo, after being spiked and buried by Mexican troops after the defeat of the Alamo by General Santa Anna and the Mexican army.

References

External links
 St. Mark's website

Churches in San Antonio
Episcopal churches in Texas
National Register of Historic Places in San Antonio
Churches on the National Register of Historic Places in Texas
Recorded Texas Historic Landmarks
Churches completed in 1877
1858 establishments in Texas